Fort Scott Municipal Airport  is a city-owned public-use airport located four miles (6 km) southwest of the central business district of Fort Scott, a city in Bourbon County, Kansas, United States.

Facilities and aircraft 
For the 12-month period ending May 10, 2006, the airport had 10,980 aircraft operations, an average of 30 per day: 96% general aviation, 2% air taxi and 2% military. At that time there were 18 aircraft based at this airport: 67% single-engine and 33% multi-engine.

References

External links

Airports in Kansas
Buildings and structures in Bourbon County, Kansas